Stenoptilia reisseri is a moth of the family Pterophoridae. It is found in Spain.

References

reisseri
Moths described in 1935
Plume moths of Europe
Taxa named by Hans Rebel